Spotniz is a surname. Notable people with the surname include:

 Frank Spotnitz (born 1960), American television writer and producer
 Henry Spotnitz, American surgeon
 Hyman Spotnitz (1908–2008), American psychoanalyst and psychiatrist
 William D. Spotnitz, American surgeon and medical researcher